Bandit Queen is a 1994 Indian Hindi-language biographical action-adventure film based on the life of Phoolan Devi as covered in the book India's Bandit Queen: The True Story of Phoolan Devi by the Indian author Mala Sen. It was written, produced, and directed by Shekhar Kapur and starred Seema Biswas as the title character. The music was composed by Ustad Nusrat Fateh Ali Khan. The film won the National Film Award for Best Feature Film in Hindi, Filmfare Critics Award for Best Movie and Best Direction for that year. The film was premiered in the Directors' Fortnight section of the 1994 Cannes Film Festival, and was screened at the Edinburgh Film Festival. The film was selected as the Indian entry for the Best Foreign Language Film at the 67th Academy Awards, but was not accepted as a nominee.

Plot 
The film opens in the summer of 1968 at a small village in Uttar Pradesh. Phoolan is married to a twenty-something year old man called Puttilal (Aditya Shrivastava). Though child marriages were customary during that time, Phoolan's mother Moola (Savitri Raekwar) objects to the timing of the match. Phoolan's aging father Devideen (Ram Charan Nirmalker) conforming to his culture, regrettably disagrees, and Phoolan is sent off with Puttilal.

Phoolan is exposed to some sexual and exploitative abuses, including the caste system. (Phoolan's family, as well as Puttilal's family, belong to the lower-ranked Mallah sub-caste; the higher ranked Thakur caste takes the lead in social and political situations.) Puttilal is physically and sexually abusive, and Phoolan eventually runs away and returns home. As Phoolan grows older, she faces incidents of (non-consensual) fondling and groping from the Thakur men (whose parents make up the panchayat or village government). At the next town meeting, the panchayat wield their patriarchal authority to banish Phoolan from the village, since she will not consent to the sexual advances of the higher caste males, who treat her like sub-human chattel.

Accordingly, Phoolan lives with her cousin Kailash (Saurabh Shukla). En route to another village, she encounters a troop of dakus (bandits) of the Babu Gujjar gang, led by Vikram Mallah Mastana (Nirmal Pandey). Phoolan stays with Kailash for a while but is eventually compelled to leave. Angry and hopeless, Phoolan goes to the local police to try to have her ban lifted, but she is beaten, molested, and arrested by the police, who rapes her while in custody. The Thakurs put up bail and have her released. But, unknown to her, the bail is a bribe (paid, through the police, to Babu Gujjar's gang), and Babu Gujjar arrives to collect his prize.

In May 1979, Phoolan is abducted by Babu Gujjar (Anirudh Agarwal). Gujjar is a physically imposing man and a ruthless, predatory mercenary. Although Gujjar's lieutenant Vikram is sympathetic towards Phoolan, Gujjar indiscriminately brutalizes and humiliates her, until one day Vikram catches him raping her (yet again) and shoots him in the head. Vikram takes over the gang, and his empathy for Phoolan eventually grows into a mutually respectful mature adult relationship.

All goes well until Thakur Shri Ram (Govind Namdeo) is released from prison. Thakur Shri Ram is the real gang leader (boss of the erstwhile Gujjar). Shri Ram returns to his gang and while Vikram receives him with respect, Shri Ram bristles at Vikram's egalitarian leadership style and covets Phoolan. Around this time, Phoolan revisits her former husband Puttilal, and with Vikram's help, abducts him and exacts her justice for his rape and abuse, beating him up. She shares her closure with Vikram.

In August 1980, Shri Ram arranges to have Vikram assassinated, and abducts Phoolan, bringing her to the village of Behmai. Phoolan is repeatedly raped and beaten by Shri Ram and by the rest of the gang members, as punishment for her "disrespect" for his previous advances, and for her audacity at being equal. The stunning and disturbing final humiliation and punishment is that she is stripped naked, paraded around Behmai, beaten, and sent to fetch water from the well (in full view of the village).

A severely traumatized Phoolan returns to her cousin Kailash. She recovers gradually and seeks out Man Singh (Manoj Bajpai), an old friend of Vikram Mallah. Man Singh brings her to another large gang, led by Baba Mustakim (Rajesh Vivek). She relates her history to Baba and asks him for some men and weapons to form a gang. Baba Mustakim agrees, and Man Singh and Phoolan become the leaders of the new gang.

Phoolan leads her new gang with courage, generosity, humility, and shrewdness. Her stockpile and her legend grow. She becomes known as Phoolan Devi, the bandit queen. In February 1981, Baba Mustakim informs her of a large wedding in Behmai, with Thakur Shri Ram in attendance. As Phoolan departs, Baba Mustakim warns her to remain low-key. Phoolan attacks the wedding party and her gang exacts revenge on the entire Thakur clan of Behmai. They round up the men and beat them up. Many of the men are finally shot. This act of vengeance brings her to the attention of the national law enforcement authorities (in New Delhi). The top police officials now begin a massive manhunt for Phoolan, and Thakur Shri Ram relishes the opportunity to come to their aid.

The manhunt claims many lives in Phoolan's gang. They are ultimately forced to hide out in the rugged ravines of Chambal without any food or water. Phoolan evaluates her options and decides to surrender. Her terms are to have her remaining mates protected and provided for (the women and children in particular). The film ends with Phoolan's surrender in February 1983. The end credits indicate that all the charges against her were withdrawn (including the charges of murder at Behmai), and that she was released in 1994.

Cast
Seema Biswas as Phoolan Devi
Nirmal Pandey as Vikram Mallah
Aditya Srivastava as Puttilal
Gajraj Rao as Ashok Chand Thakur (Sarpanch's son)
Saurabh Shukla as Kailash
Manoj Bajpayee as Maan Singh
Raghuvir Yadav as Madho
Rajesh Vivek as Baba Mustakim
Anirudh Agarwal as Babu Gujjar
Govind Namdev as Thakur Shri Ram
Shekhar Kapur as a Lorry driver (cameo appearance)

Soundtrack 

The film's music was composed by Nusrat Fateh Ali Khan, with Khan also voicing the non-instrumental pieces in the soundtrack which include tracks based on traditional Rajasthani music.

Release

Box office
In India, the film grossed . In the United States and Canada, the film grossed $399,748. Combined, the film grossed approximately  worldwide.

Controversy
Although Phoolan Devi is a heroine in the film, she fiercely disputed its accuracy and fought to get it banned in India. She even threatened to immolate herself outside a theater if the film were not withdrawn. Eventually, she withdrew her objections after the producer Channel 4 paid her £40,000. Author-activist Arundhati Roy in her film review entitled, "The Great Indian Rape Trick", questioned the right to "restage the rape of a living woman without her permission", and charged Shekhar Kapur with exploiting Phoolan Devi and misrepresenting both her life and its meaning.

Critical reception
The film has a Rotten Tomatoes approval rating of 100% based on 25 reviews, with an average score of 7.58/10. Jonathan Rosenbaum called it "an eye-filling and often stirring movie", writing that at "its best, this recalls radical third-world 'westerns' like Glauber Rocha's Antonio das mortes as well as Kenji Mizoguchi's films about men's inhumanity to women." He writes, however, that the film "despite its ambition, bracing anger, and visual panache ... remains many notches below such reference points because of its sensationalistic and fairly indiscriminate piling on of horrors and violence, which ultimately becomes pornographic. The issue isn't what actually happened to Phoolan Devi ... The issue is the film's tendency to desensitize us with a surfeit of details." James Berardinelli gave the film 3.5 stars out of 4, writing that the "picture of human indignity and suffering painted by Bandit Queen is on par with that of Schindler's List. As the Nazis treated the Jews like animals, so too do the upper caste Indians regard those born into poverty and squalor." "Tightly-paced, powerfully-written, and well-acted", he writes, "Bandit Queen is a first-rate adventure movie." Edward Guthmann of San Francisco Chronicle gave the film 3 stars out of 4 and described it as a "handsome, impassioned film" and praised Biswas' performance, calling it "fireball of unrelenting, white-hot fury -- a slap in the face to her country and its barbaric, outdated treatment of women." He notes that the film "makes no pretense of objectivity. Kapur clearly is outraged by the gender and caste biases of his country". This lack of objectivity is countered by Richard Corliss, who called it an "exciting movie that brings Devi's story to life with passion but without passing judgment."

Awards 
39th Valladolid International Film Festival:

Nominated

  Golden Spike for Best Feature Film – Shekhar Kapur

43rd National Film Awards:
 Best Feature Film in Hindi – Kaleidoscope Entertainment
 Best Actress – Seema Biswas
 Best Costume Design – Dolly Ahluwalia

 40th Filmfare Awards:

Won

 Best Film (Critics) – Shekhar Kapur

42nd Filmfare Awards:

 Best Director – Shekhar Kapur
 Best Female Debut – Seema Biswas
 Best Cinematography – Ashok Mehta

Nominated

 Best Film – Kaleidoscope Entertainment
 Best Actress – Seema Biswas

Further reading
 Richard Shears and Isobelle Gidley, Devi: The Bandit Queen, Allen & Unwin, 1984. .
 Mala Sen, India's Bandit Queen: The True Story of Phoolan Devi, HarperCollins, 1993. .
 Irène Frain, Devi, Fayard, 1993. . (in French)
 Phoolan Devi, Marie-Thérèse Cuny and Paul Rambali, I, Phoolan Devi: The Autobiography of India's Bandit Queen, Little, Brown and Company, 1996. 
 Roy Moxham, Outlaw: India's Bandit Queen and Me, Rider, 2010.

Other sources 
 Manju Jain, Reading Rape: Sexual Difference, Representational Excess and Narrative Containment pp. 9–16, in: Narratives of Indian Cinema Primus, 2009 
 India's Bandit Queen by Mary Anne Weaver
 Sunita J. Peacock, Phoolan Devi: The Primordial Tradition of the Bandit Queen, pp. 187–195, in: Transnationalism and the Asian American Heroine: Essays on Literature, Film, Myth and Media, McFarland, 2010

See also
List of films with a 100% rating on Rotten Tomatoes
List of Indian submissions for the Academy Award for Best International Feature Film
List of submissions to the 67th Academy Awards for Best Foreign Language Film
Phoolan Devi (1985 film)

References

External links 

 

1994 films
1994 action films
1994 crime drama films
1990s biographical drama films
Indian action adventure films
Indian biographical drama films
Indian crime drama films
Indian feminist films
Films about organised crime in India
Films about rape in India
Films about sexism
Indian rape and revenge films
Films about the caste system in India
Films about women in India
Films directed by Shekhar Kapur
1990s Hindi-language films
Cultural depictions of robbers
Cultural depictions of Indian women
Films that won the Best Costume Design National Film Award
Best Hindi Feature Film National Film Award winners
Fictional portrayals of the Uttar Pradesh Police
Films based on Indian novels
Films scored by Nusrat Fateh Ali Khan